is a Japanese actress and singer.

History 
Nao was born in Ikoma, Nara on 8 February 1985 and grew up in Kawanishi, Hyōgo. Winning Japan's Elite Model Look started her modeling career in earnest. She attended the Tokyo College of Music.

Discography

Singles
[2007.07.11] Moonshine ～Tsukiakari～ (Moonshine～月あかり～)
[2007.12.19] Rain
[2008.02.27] Nagareru Kumo Yori mo Hayaku (流れる雲よりもはやく)

Albums
[2006.10.18] dolce
[2007.10.10] poco A poco
[2008.02.27] Eiga Chest Original Soundtrack (映画「チェスト」オリジナル・サウンドトラック)
[2009.02.04] pf

Filmography

Television
Ko inu no warutu (2004) Nao plays the Minute Waltz.
Ningen no Shōmei (2004) as Michiko Asaeda
Honjitsu mo Hare. Ijo Nashi (2009) as Saimon Ulala
 Ohitorisama (2009)
GEGEGE no Nyobo (2010) as Nunoe Iida
Control (2011) as Rio Segawa
Dear Sister (2014) as Hazuki Fukazawa
A Song to the Sun (2015, corporate with Vietnamese Television) as Asami
Hayako Sensei, Kekkon Surutte Honto Desu Ka? (2016) as Hayako Tatsuki
Totto-chan! (2017) as Chō Kuroyanagi
Manpuku (2018)
Yū-san no Nyōbō (2021) as Makiko Ishihara

Films
Sand Chronicles (2008) as Ann Minase
Angel Sign (2019)

Dubbing
Doctor Strange as Christine Palmer (Rachel McAdams)
Doctor Strange in the Multiverse of Madness as Christine Palmer (Rachel McAdams)

References

External links 
Matsushita Nao official site
Matsushita Nao pianist side official site
JDorama entry

Japanese pianists
Japanese women pianists
Japanese actresses
Japanese female models
Living people
1985 births
Asadora lead actors
21st-century Japanese pianists
21st-century Japanese women musicians
21st-century women pianists